Hurst may refer to:

Places

England 
 Hurst, Berkshire, a village
 Hurst, North Yorkshire, a hamlet
 Hurst, a settlement within the village of Martock, Somerset
 Hurst, West Sussex, a hamlet
 Hurst Spit, a shingle spit in Hampshire
 Hurst Castle
 Hurst Hill, Lancashire
 Hurst Reservoir, a disused reservoir near Glossop, north Derbyshire

United States 
 Hurst, Illinois, a city
 Hurst, Missouri, a ghost town
 Hurst, Texas, a city
 Hurst, West Virginia, an unincorporated community

Antarctica 
 Hurst Peak, Ellsworth Land
 Hurst Bay, James Ross Island

Schools 
 The Hurst School, Baughurst, Hampshire, England
 Hurst High School, Norvelt, Pennsylvania, United States
 Hurst Junior High School, Hurst, Texas, United States

Other uses 
 Hurst (surname)
 C. Hurst & Co., British publishing company
 , the name of more than one United States Navy ship
 Hurst Street, Birmingham, England
 Ashton United F.C., an English football club founded as Hurst F.C. in 1878

See also 
 Hurst exponent
 Hurst Performance, products for automobiles
 Hearst (disambiguation)
 Herst (disambiguation)
 Hirst (disambiguation)
 Horst (disambiguation)